The Donald Meek Awards, named in honour of Scottish Gaelic writer and professor Donald Meek, are annual prizes for original works in Scottish Gaelic of any genre. The awards are given by Comhairle nan Leabhraichean and funded by Creative Scotland and Bòrd na Gàidhlig.

References

Scottish literary awards
Scottish Gaelic language
Scottish Gaelic literature